Thomas Kielty Scherman (February 12, 1917 – May 14, 1979) was an American conductor and the founder of the Little Orchestra Society.

Biography

He was a son of Bernardine (née Kielty) and Harry Scherman, founder and president of the Book of the Month Club. His father was Jewish and his mother was of Irish and Welsh descent. His sister is Katharine Scherman Rosin (married to Axel Rosin). He attended Columbia University and then studied piano with  Isabelle Vengerova and conducting with  Carl Bamberger and  Otto Klemperer. He served in the U.S. Army (1939–1941), reaching the rank of captain.

References

1917 births
1979 deaths
American male conductors (music)
20th-century American conductors (music)
20th-century American male musicians
American people of Jewish descent
American people of Irish descent
American people of Welsh descent
Columbia University alumni